The Santa Susana Field Laboratory (SSFL), formerly known as Rocketdyne, is a complex of industrial research and development facilities located on a  portion of Southern California in an unincorporated area of Ventura County in the Simi Hills between Simi Valley and Los Angeles. Sage Ranch Park is adjacent on part of the northern boundary and the community of Bell Canyon is along the entire southern boundary.

SSFL was used mainly for the development and testing of liquid-propellant rocket engines for the United States space program from 1949 to 2006, nuclear reactors from 1953 to 1980 and the operation of a U.S. government-sponsored liquid metals research center from 1966 to 1998. Throughout the years, about ten low-power nuclear reactors operated at SSFL, (including the Sodium Reactor Experiment, the first reactor in the United States to generate electrical power for a commercial grid, and the first commercial power plant in the world to experience a partial core meltdown) in addition to several "critical facilities" that helped develop nuclear science and applications. At least four of the ten nuclear reactors had accidents during their operation. The reactors located on the grounds of SSFL were considered experimental, and therefore had no containment structures.

The site ceased research and development operations in 2006. The years of rocket testing, nuclear reactor testing, and liquid metal research have left the site "significantly contaminated". Environmental cleanup is ongoing. The public who live near the site have strongly urged a thorough cleanup of the site, citing cases of long term illnesses, including cancer cases at rates they claim are higher than normal. On 30 March 2018, a 7-year-old girl living in Simi Valley died of neuroblastoma, prompting public urging to thoroughly clean up the site. Experts have said, however, that there is insufficient evidence to identify an explicit link between cancer rates and radioactive contamination in the area.

Introduction

Since 1947 the Santa Susana Field Laboratory location has been used by a number of companies and agencies. The first was Rocketdyne, originally a division of North American Aviation (NAA), which developed a variety of pioneering, successful, and reliable liquid rocket engines. Some were used in the Navaho cruise missile, the Redstone rocket, the Thor and Jupiter ballistic missiles, early versions of the Delta and Atlas rockets, the Saturn rocket family, and the Space Shuttle Main Engine. The Atomics International division of North American Aviation used a separate and dedicated portion of the Santa Susana Field Laboratory to build and operate the first commercial nuclear power plant in the United States, as well as for the testing and development of compact nuclear reactors, including the first and only known nuclear reactor launched into Low Earth Orbit by the United States, the SNAP-10A. Atomics International also operated the Energy Technology Engineering Center for the U.S. Department of Energy at the site. The Santa Susana Field Laboratory includes sites identified as historic by the American Institute of Aeronautics and Astronautics and by the American Nuclear Society. In 1996, The Boeing Company became the primary owner and operator of the Santa Susana Field Laboratory and later closed the site.

Three California state agencies and three federal agencies have been overseeing a detailed investigation of environmental impacts from historical site operations since at least 1990. Concerns about the environmental impact of past disposal practices have inspired at least two lawsuits seeking payment from Boeing, and several interest groups are actively involved with steering the ongoing environmental investigation.

The Santa Susana Field Laboratory is the focus of diverse interests. Burro Flats Painted Cave, listed on the National Register of Historic Places, is located within the Santa Susana Field Laboratory boundaries, on a portion of the site owned by the U.S. government. The drawings within the cave have been termed "the best preserved Indian pictograph in Southern California." Several tributary streams to the Los Angeles River have headwater watersheds on the SSFL property, including Bell Creek (90% of SSFL drainage), Dayton Creek, Woolsey Canyon, and Runkle Creek.

History

SSFL was a United States government facility dedicated to the development and testing of nuclear reactors, powerful rockets such as the Delta II, and the systems that powered the Apollo missions. The location of SSFL was chosen in 1947 for its remoteness in order to conduct work that was considered too dangerous and too noisy to be performed in more densely populated areas. In subsequent years, however, the Southern California population grew, along with housing developments surrounding "The Hill". 

The site is divided into four production and two buffer areas (Area I, II, III, and IV, and the northern and southern buffer zones). Areas I through III were used for rocket testing, missile testing, and munitions development. Area IV was used primarily for nuclear reactor experimentation and development. Laser research for the Strategic Defense Initiative (popularly known as "Star Wars") was also conducted in Area IV.

Rocket engine development
North American Aviation (NAA) began its development of liquid propellant rocket engines after the end of WWII. The Rocketdyne division of NAA, which came into being under its own name in the mid-1950s, designed and tested several rocket engines at the facility. They included engines for the Army's Redstone (an advanced short-range version of the German V-2), and the Army Jupiter intermediate range ballistic missile (IRBM) as well as the Air Force's counterpart IRBM, the Thor. Also included among those developed there, were engines for the Atlas Intercontinental Ballistic Missile (ICBM), as well as the twin combustion chamber alcohol/liquid oxygen booster engine for the Navaho, a large, intercontinental cruise missile that never became operational. Later, Rocketdyne designed and tested the J-2 liquid oxygen/hydrogen engine which was used on the second and third stages of the Saturn V launch rocket developed for the moon-bound Project Apollo mission.  While the J-2 was tested at the facility, Rocketdyne's huge F-1 engine for the first stage of the Saturn V was tested in the Mojave desert near Edwards Air Force Base. This was due to safety and noise considerations, since SSFL was too close to populated areas.

Nuclear and energy research and development

The Atomics International Division of North American Aviation used SSFL Area IV as the site of United States first commercial nuclear power plant  and the testing and development of the SNAP-10A, the first nuclear reactor launched into outer space by the United States. Atomics International also operated the Energy Technology Engineering Center at the site for the U.S. government. As overall interest in nuclear power declined, Atomics International made a transition to non-nuclear energy-related projects, such as coal gasification, and gradually, ceased designing and testing nuclear reactors. Atomics International eventually was merged with the Rocketdyne division in 1978.

Sodium reactor experiment

The Sodium Reactor Experiment (SRE) was an experimental nuclear reactor that operated at the site from 1957 to 1964 and was the first commercial power plant in the world to experience a core meltdown. There was a decades-long cover-up of the incident by the U.S. Department of Energy. The operation predated environmental regulation, so early disposal techniques are not recorded in detail.  Thousands of pounds of sodium coolant from the time of the meltdown are not yet accounted for.

The reactor and support systems were removed in 1981 and the building torn down in 1999.

The 1959 sodium reactor incident was chronicled on History Channel's program Engineering Disasters 19.

Energy Technology Engineering Center

The Energy Technology Engineering Center (ETEC), was a government-owned, contractor-operated complex of industrial facilities located within Area IV of the Santa Susana Field Laboratory. The ETEC specialized in non-nuclear testing of components which were designed to transfer heat from a nuclear reactor using liquid metals instead of water or gas.  The center operated from 1966 to 1998. The ETEC site has been closed and is now undergoing building removal and environmental remediation by the U.S. Department of Energy.

Accidents and site contamination

Nuclear reactors
Throughout the years, approximately ten low-power nuclear reactors operated at SSFL, in addition to several "critical facilities": a sodium burn pit in which sodium-coated objects were burned in an open pit; a plutonium fuel fabrication facility; a uranium carbide fuel fabrication facility; and the purportedly largest "Hot Lab" facility in the United States at the time. (A hot lab is a facility used for remotely handling or machining radioactive material.) Irradiated nuclear fuel from other Atomic Energy Commission (AEC) and Department of Energy (DOE) facilities from around the country was shipped to SSFL to be decladded and examined.

The hot lab suffered a number of fires involving radioactive materials. For example, in 1957, a fire in the hot cell "got out of control and ... massive contamination" resulted.

At least four of the ten nuclear reactors suffered accidents: 1) The AE6 reactor experienced a release of fission gases in March 1959. 2) In July 1959, the SRE experienced a power excursion and partial meltdown that released 28 Curies of radioactive noble gases. The release resulted in the maximum off-site exposure of 0.099 millirem and an exposure of 0.018 millirem for the nearest residential building which is well within current limits today. 3) In 1964, the SNAP8ER experienced damage to 80% of its fuel. 4) In 1969 the SNAP8DR experienced similar damage to one-third of its fuel.

A radioactive fire occurred in 1971, involving combustible primary reactor coolant (NaK) contaminated with mixed fission products.

Sodium burn pits

The sodium burn pit, an open-air pit for cleaning sodium-contaminated components, was also contaminated by the burning of radioactively and chemically contaminated items in it, in contravention of safety requirements. In an article in the Ventura County Star, James Palmer, a former SSFL worker, was interviewed. The article notes that "of the 27 men on Palmer's crew, 22 died of cancers." On some nights Palmer returned home from work and kissed "his wife [hello], only to burn her lips with the chemicals he had breathed at work." The report also noted that "During their breaks, Palmer's crew would fish in one of three ponds ... The men would use a solution that was 90 percent hydrogen peroxide to neutralize the contamination. Sometimes, the water was so polluted it bubbled. The fish died off." Palmer's interview ended with: "They had seven wells up there, water wells, and every damn one of them was contaminated," Palmer said, "It was a horror story."

In 2002, a Department of Energy (DOE) official described typical waste disposal procedures used by Field Lab employees in the past. Workers would dispose of barrels filled with radioactive sodium by dumping them in a pond and then shooting the barrels with rifles so that they would explode and release their contents into the air. Since then, the pit has been remediated by having 22,000 cubic yards of soil removed down 10-12 feet to bedrock.

On 26 July 1994, two scientists, Otto K. Heiney and  Larry A. Pugh were killed when the chemicals they were illegally burning in open pits exploded. After a grand jury investigation and FBI raid on the facility, three Rocketdyne officials pleaded guilty in June 2004 to illegally storing explosive materials. The jury deadlocked on the more serious charges related to illegal burning of hazardous waste. At trial, a retired Rocketdyne mechanic testified as to what he witnessed at the time of the explosion: "I assumed we were burning waste," Lee Wells testified, comparing the process used on 21 and 26 July 1994, to that once used to legally dispose of leftover chemicals at the company's old burn pit. As Heiney poured the chemicals for what would have been the third burn of the day, the blast occurred, Wells said. "[The background noise] was so loud I didn't hear anything ... I felt the blast and I looked down and my shirt was coming apart."  When he realized what had occurred, Wells said, "I felt to see if I was all there ... I knew I was burned but I didn't know how bad."  Wells suffered second- and third-degree burns to his face, arms and stomach.

2018 Woolsey fire
The 2018 Woolsey Fire began at SSFL and burned about 80% of the site. After the fire, the Los Angeles County Department of Public Health found "no discernible level of radiation in the tested area" and the California Department of Toxic Substances Control, which is overseeing cleanup of the site, said in an interim report that "previously handled radioactive and hazardous materials were not affected by the fire." Bob Dodge, President of Physicians for Social Responsibility-Los Angeles, said "When it burns and becomes airborne in smoke and ash, there is real possibility of heightened exposure for area residents." 

In 2020, the California Department of Toxic Substances Control (DTSC) stated in their final report that the fire did not cause contaminants to be released from the site into Simi Valley and other neighboring communities and that the risk from smoke exposure during the fire was not higher than what is normally associated with wildfire.

In 2021 a study which collected 360 samples of dust, ash, and soils from homes and public lands three weeks after the fire found that most samples were at normal levels, ("Data did not support a finding of widespread deposition of radioactive particles.") but that two locations "contained high activities of radioactive isotopes associated with the Santa Susana Field Laboratory."

Medical claims
In October 2006, the Santa Susana Field Laboratory Advisory Panel, made up of independent scientists and researchers from around the United States, concluded that based on available data and computer models, contamination at the facility resulted in an estimated 260 cancer related deaths. The report also concluded that the SRE meltdown caused the release of more than 458 times the amount of radioactivity released by the Three Mile Island accident. While the nuclear core of the SRE released 10 times less radiation than the TMI incident, the lack of proper containment such as concrete structures caused this radiation to be released into the surrounding environment. The radiation released by the core of the TMI was largely contained.

According to studies conducted by Hal Morgenstern between 1988 and 2002, residents living within 2 miles of the laboratory are 60% more likely to be diagnosed with certain cancers compared to residents living 5 miles from the laboratory, though Morgenstern said that the lab is not necessarily the cause.

Cleanup
During its years of operation, highly toxic chemical additives were widely used in order to power over 30,000 rocket engine tests and to clean the rocket test-stands afterwards. In addition, considerable nuclear research and at least four nuclear accidents occurred, which resulted in the SSFL becoming a seriously contaminated site and an offsite pollution source, requiring a sophisticated multi-agency Cleanup Project.  An ongoing  process to determine the site contamination levels and locations, cleanup standards to meet, methods to use, costs, timelines and completion requirements – are still being  debated, and litigated.

Standards history
In early May 2007, a Federal Court in San Francisco issued a major ruling which concluded that DOE has not been cleaning up the site to proper standards, and that the site would have to be cleaned up to higher standards if DOE ever wanted to release the site to Boeing, which in turn, would most likely release the land for unrestricted residential development. Judge "Conti's ruling requires DOE to prepare a more stringent review of the lab, which is on the border of Los Angeles County. Conti wrote that the department's decision to prepare a less-stringent environmental document prior to cleanup is in violation of the National Environmental Policy Act and noted that the lab 'is located only miles away from one of the largest population centers in the world.'"

Runoff issues
On 26 July 2007, the staff at the Los Angeles Regional Water Quality Control Board recommended a $471,190 fine against Boeing for 79 violations of the California Water Code during an 18-month period. From October 2004 to January 2006, wastewater and stormwater runoff coming from the lab had increased levels of chromium, dioxin, lead, mercury, and other pollutants, the board said. The contaminated water flowed into Bell Creek and the Los Angeles River in violation of a 1 July 2004 permit that allowed the release of wastewater and stormwater runoff as long as it didn't contain high levels of pollutants.

Parkland
According to the plan jointly announced by California Gov. Arnold Schwarzenegger, Boeing, and state Sen. Sheila Kuehl, the property will be donated and preserved as a vital undeveloped open-space link in the Simi Hills, above the Simi Valley and the San Fernando Valley. The agreement will permanently restrict the land for nonresidential, noncommercial use."

Cleanup developments 2007–present

SB 990
The California state senate bill SB 990, passed into law in 2007, set the standards for the site's cleanup. To achieve them, the responsible parties, consisting of Boeing, DOE, and NASA, need to sign agreements of acceptance and cleanup compliance.

Boeing
Boeing contested the law, filing a lawsuit in September 2009 to release it from compliance, with a court date set for summer 2011. Boeing won the suit and claims it will clean up the site, although to levels far below those outlined in SB 990.

DOE and NASA
In September 2010 DOE and NASA agreed to meet the stringent cleanup standards set for the site in the state's SB 990 legislation, and to cover all costs for their cleanup's implementation. This agreement marks significant progress in the SSFL cleanup sequence. In 2014, NASA issued a final environmental impact statement containing mitigation measures that would demolish all structures and remediate soil and groundwater contamination. NASA issued a 2014 report highlighting cleanup technology feasibility studies, soil and groundwater fieldwork, and additional archaeology surveys that would be performed in preparation for the demolition of the structures. NASA determined that substantially more soil needed to be removed from its part of the site than what it estimated in the 2014 report so a supplemental report was prepared in 2019.

Demolition of abandoned buildings on the site was scheduled to start in early 2015 after abatement of asbestos, lead paint and other regulated materials. The test stands would follow and are the most complex to tear down but all demolition was to have been completed in 2016. Because of their historical significance, one test stand and one control building will remain if the cleanup goals can still be met. The cleanup was projected to be completed in 2017. In 2019, the U.S. Department of Energy announced that it has decided to demolish and remove 13 of 18 remaining structures. In 2020, an agreement was reached to demolish 10 of the most highly contaminated structures.

Community involvement

Community advisory group
A petition to form a "CAG" or community advisory group was denied in March 2010 by DTSC.  In 2012, the current CAG's petition was approved. The SSFL CAG recommends that all responsible parties execute a risk-based cleanup to EPA's suburban residential standard that will minimize excavation, soil removal and backfill and thus reduce danger to public health and functions of surrounding communities. However, SSFL Panel believes the CAG has a conflict of interest, as it is funded in large part by a grant from the U.S. Department of Energy, and three of its members are former employees of Boeing or its parent company, North American Aviation.

Documentary
In 2021, the three hour documentary In the Dark of the Valley depicted mothers advocating for cleanup of the site who have children suffering from cancer believed to be caused by the contamination.

See also
 Nuclear and radiation accidents and incidents
 Nuclear labor issues
 Nuclear reactor accidents in the United States

References

External links and sources

Agencies
 CA-DTSC-Santa Susana Field Laboratory website: site investigation and cleanup news, Listserv e-mail newsletter, calendar, documentation download links, contacts.
 
 
  – PDF of a presentation given on 19 August 2003.
 
 
 The Santa Susana Advisory Panel
 The Rocketdyne Information Society Public Forum on SSFL cleanup.
 
 lamountains Sage Ranch Park website.
 
 
 
Historic American Engineering Record (HAER) documentation, filed under 5800 Woolsey Canyon Road, Simi Valley, Ventura County, CA:

National Park Service Heritage Documentation Programs

Groups and info
 Sage Ranch Park website
 
 
  – PDF of a presentation given on 19 August 2003.

Media
 EnviroReporter.com: Investigative news website that has coverage of Rocketdyne issues since 1998, often in partnership with regional publications including the LA Weekly and Ventura County Reporter newspapers.
 
 
 
 Joel Grover and Matthew Glasser LA'S Nuclear Secret, Part 1-5 NBC4, 21 September 2015, retrieved 23 December 2015.

Reactor accident sources
 , Release of Fission Gas from the AE-6 Reactor, hosted by RocketdyneWatch.org
 , Analysis of SRE Power Excursion, hosted by RocketdyneWatch.org
 , SRE Fuel Element Damage an Interim Report, hosted by RocketdyneWatch.org
 , SRE Fuel Element Damage Final Report, hosted by RocketdyneWatch.org
 , SNAP8 Experimental Reactor Fuel Element Behavior: Atomics International Task Force Review, hosted by RocketdyneWatch.org
 , Postoperation Evaluation of Fuel Elements from the SNAP8 Experimental Reactor hosted by RocketdyneWatch.org
 , Findings of the SNAP 8 Developmental Reactor (S8DR) Post-Test Examination, hosted by RocketdyneWatch.org

Rocketdyne
Rocketry
Energy infrastructure in California
Nuclear research institutes
Simi Hills
Atomics International
North American Aviation
Boeing
Buildings and structures in Ventura County, California
Buildings and structures in Los Angeles County, California
Buildings and structures in Simi Valley, California
Environmental disasters in the United States
Disasters in California
Civilian nuclear power accidents
Radioactively contaminated areas
Environment of California
1947 establishments in California
Historic American Engineering Record in California
History of Los Angeles County, California
History of Ventura County, California
History of the San Fernando Valley
History of Simi Valley, California
Canoga Park, Los Angeles
West Hills, Los Angeles
San Fernando Valley
Santa Susana Mountains
Nuclear research reactors
Nuclear accidents and incidents in the United States